The Proceedings of the Combustion Institute are the proceedings of the biennial Combustion Symposium put on by The Combustion Institute. The publication contains the most significant contributions in fundamentals and applications fundamental research of combustion science combustion phenomena. Research papers and invited topical reviews are included on topics of reaction kinetics, soot, PAH and other large molecules, diagnostics, laminar flames, turbulent flames, heterogenous combustion, spray and droplet combustion, detonations, explosions & supersonic combustion, fire research, stationary combustion systems, internal combustion engine and gas turbine combustion, and new technology concepts. The editors-in-chief are Daniel C. Haworth (Pennsylvania State University) and Terese Løvås (no) (Norwegian University of Science and Technology).

History
The need for development of automotive engines, fuels, and aviation formed the basis for the organization which became The Combustion Institute. The first three symposiums were held in 1928, 1937, and 1948. Since 1952, symposiums have been held every second year. The first combustion symposium with published proceedings was in 1948.

Abstracting and indexing 
The journal is abstracted and indexed in:

According to the Journal Citation Reports, the journal has a 2015 impact factor of 4.120.

See also

References

External links 
 

Chemistry journals
Physics journals
Publications established in 1948
Elsevier academic journals
Engineering journals
English-language journals
Combustion
Biennial journals